Ohne Filter was a 45-minute live television program by German public TV station SWF featuring international pop and rock groups. In contrast to Rockpalast (WDR), which was broadcast from larger venues such as the Grugahalle, Ohne Filter was produced at the more intimate setting of a regular TV studio. By the end of 1983, it had become one of the most popular German television music programs. Around 300 issues were produced including performances by Chaka Khan, Joe Cocker and Deep Purple, to name but a few.

Translated from the German Wikipedia

1983 German television series debuts
2000 German television series endings
1990s German television series
German music television series
German-language television shows
Das Erste original programming